The Men's madison competition at the 2019 UCI Track Cycling World Championships was held on 3 March 2019.

Results
The race was started at 14:59. 200 laps (50 km) with 20 sprints were raced.

References

Men's madison
2019